Giulio Caracciolo may refer to
Giulio Caracciolo (archbishop of Iconium) (born 1627), 17th century Italian Roman Catholic bishop
Giulio Caracciolo (archbishop of Cassano all'Jonio) (died 1599), 16th Italian century Roman Catholic bishop

Disambiguation pages